Konstantin Nikolayevich Grachev (born 17 April 1927) is a retired Russian sprinter. He competed at the 1956 Summer Olympics and 1960 Summer Olympics in the 400 m and 4 × 400 m events, but failed to reach the finals. During his career Grachev won seven Soviet titles and one European title in the 400 m. After retiring from competitions he moved to Dnipropetrovsk, Ukraine.

References

1927 births
Living people
Russian male sprinters
Olympic athletes of the Soviet Union
Athletes (track and field) at the 1956 Summer Olympics
Athletes (track and field) at the 1960 Summer Olympics
Soviet male sprinters